Events in the year 1934 in Germany.

Incumbents

National level
Head of State
 President:
Paul von Hindenburg (until 2 August 1934)
Adolf Hitler (from 2 August 1934; as Führer and Chancellor)

 Chancellor: 
Adolf Hitler (Nazi Party)

Events
 1 January — Germany passes the "Law for the Prevention of Hereditarily Diseased Offspring".
 10 January — Marinus van der Lubbe is executed in Germany.
 26 January — The 10 year German-Polish Non-Aggression Pact is signed by Germany and the Second Polish Republic.
 20 March — All the police forces in Germany come under the command of Heinrich Himmler.
 29 May-31 May — The Confessional Synod of the German Evangelical Church meets in Barmen, Germany to write the Barmen Declaration.
 30 June —
The Nazi SA camp Oranienburg becomes a national camp, taken over by the SS.
Night of the Long Knives: Nazis purge the SA.
 10 July — German Social Democrat and author Erich Mühsam is killed in Oranienburg concentration camp.
 2 August — President Paul von Hindenburg dies and Adolf Hitler declares himself Führer of Germany, becoming head of state as well as Chancellor.
 19 August — German voters retroactively endorse Hitler's assumption of the powers of head of state in a referendum, with 89.9% in favor; Hitler effectively becomes the absolute dictator of Germany.
 5–10 September  — The 6th Nazi Party Congress is held in Nuremberg, attended by about 700,000 Nazi Party supporters and the Leni Riefenstahl film Triumph des Willens is made at this rally.

Births
 1 January - Hans Huber, German boxer
 4 January - Hellmuth Karasek, German journalist, literary critic, novelist and author (died 2015)
 29 January - Paul Gutama Soegijo, German musician and composer (died 2019)
 20 March - Peter Berling, German actor (died 2017)
 27 March
 Jutta Limbach, German politician and jurist (died 2016)
 Peter Schamoni, German film director (died 2011)
 1 April - Elmar Faber, German book publisher (died 2017)
 5 April - Roman Herzog, German politician, President of Germany (died 2017)
 13 April - Siegfried Matthus, German composer (died 2021)
 27 April - Jürgen Kühling, German judge (died 2019)
 27 May - Uwe Friedrichsen, German actor (died 2016)
 21 June - Josef Stoer, German mathematician 
 3 July
 Klaus von Beyme, German political scientist (died 2021)
 Berthold Maria Schenk Graf von Stauffenberg, German general
 10 July - Alfred Biolek, German television presenter (died 2021)
 17 July 
 Rainer Kirsch, German journalist and writer (died 2015)
 Horst Steinmann, German economist
 20 July - Uwe Johnson, German writer (died 1984)
 29 July — Albert Speer, Jr., German architect (died 2017)
 29 August - Horst Szymaniak, German football player (died 2009)
 5 September - Paul Josef Cordes, German cardinal 
 7 September -  Mary Bauermeister, German artist (died 2023)
 16 September - Hans A. Engelhard, German jurist and politician (died 2008)
 24 September - Manfred Wörner, German politician (died 1994)
 7 October — Ulrike Meinhof, German terrorist (died 1976)
 19 October —  Eva-Maria Hagen, German actress and singer (died 2022)
 15 November - Martin Bangemann, German politician (died 2022)
 21 November - Gerhard Erber, German pianist (died 2021)
 24 November - Wolfgang Rademann, German television producer and journalist (died 2016)
 30 November - Albert, Margrave of Meissen, German nobleman (died 2012)
 5 December - Eberhard Jüngel, German Lutheran theologian (died 2021)

Deaths 
 1 January — Jakob Wassermann, Jewish-German novelist (born 1873)
 21 January - Paul Troost, German architect (born 1878)
 29 January - Fritz Haber, German chemist (born 1868)
 1 March - Wilhelm Diegelmann, German actor (born 1861)
 7 April - Karl von Einem, Prussian Minister of War (born 1853)
 10 June - Victor Villiger, Swiss-German chemist (born 1868)
 19 June – Prince Bernhard of Lippe (born 1872)
 30 June (assassinations associated with The Night of the Long Knives):
 Gregor Strasser, German Imperial soldier and early Nazi (born 1892)
 Kurt von Schleicher, German Imperial general, politician and former Chancellor of Germany (born 1882)
 Gustav Ritter von Kahr, German politician (born 1862)
 Erich Klausener, German Catholic politician (born 1885)
 Herbert von Bose, German politician (born 1893)
 Edmund Heines, Nazi paramilitary (born 1897)
 Ferdinand von Bredow, German Generalmajor, former head of the Abwehr (born 1884)
 Fritz Gerlich, German journalist and historian (born 1883)
 Peter von Heydebreck, German Imperial Army officer and Nazi paramilitary (born 1889)
 Karl Ernst, Nazi paramilitary (born 1904)
 July - Karl-Günther Heimsoth, German physician and polygraph (born 1899)
 1 July
 Edgar Julius Jung, German lawyer and political activist (born 1894)
 Ernst Röhm, German Imperial Army officer and Nazi paramilitary (born 1887)
 10 July - Erich Mühsam, German poet and playwright (born 1878)
 13 July - Fritz Graebner, German ethnologist (born 1877)
 2 August — Paul von Hindenburg, German general and politician (born 1847)
 15 October - Samuel von Fischer, German publisher (born 1859)
 19 October – Alexander von Kluck, German general (born 1846)
 20 October — Hans Böhning, World War I German flying ace (born 1893)
 12 November - Walther Bensemann, German  pioneer of football and founder of the country's major sports publication, Kicker (born 1873)
 16 November - Carl von Linde, German engineer and scientist (born 1842)
 17 November - Joachim Ringelnatz, German writer (born 1883)
 5 December – Oskar von Hutier, German general (born 1857)

References

 
Years of the 20th century in Germany
1934 in Europe